Li Xiayan (17 December 1989, Dali) is a Chinese swimmer. At the 2012 Summer Olympics, he competed in the Men's 100 metre breaststroke, finishing in 28th place in the heats, failing to reach the semifinals.  He was also part of the Chinese men's 4 x 100 m medley relay team.

References

Living people
Swimmers from Yunnan
Olympic swimmers of China
Swimmers at the 2012 Summer Olympics
Chinese male breaststroke swimmers
Sportspeople from Kunming
Asian Games medalists in swimming
Swimmers at the 2010 Asian Games
Asian Games bronze medalists for China
Medalists at the 2010 Asian Games

1989 births
21st-century Chinese people